Josef Tauchner (10 February 1929 – 17 July 1983) was an Austrian weightlifter. He competed at the 1952 Summer Olympics, the 1956 Summer Olympics and the 1960 Summer Olympics.

References

External links
 

1929 births
1983 deaths
Austrian male weightlifters
Olympic weightlifters of Austria
Weightlifters at the 1952 Summer Olympics
Weightlifters at the 1956 Summer Olympics
Weightlifters at the 1960 Summer Olympics
World Weightlifting Championships medalists
20th-century Austrian people